Flavia Laos Urbina is a Peruvian actress, TV host, singer and model. In 2022 she was Latin Influencer of the Year.

Filmography

Film
 No me digas solterona 
 El Niño Dios

Televsion
 Miss Pequeñita
 Hora Wanner
 America Kids
 La Academia 
 Ven, baila, quinceañera
 VBQ: Todo Por La Fama
 VBQ: Empezando a Vivir
 Los Vílchez
 Te volveré a encontrar
 Princesas

Reality TV appearances
 Combate
 Reto De Campeones
 Esto es guerra
 Too Hot to Handle

Discography
 2019 - Despierta (EP)

Awards 
 Influencer of the Year – People's Choice Awards 2022

References

External links
 
 

Year of birth missing (living people)
Place of birth missing (living people)
Living people
Peruvian female models
Peruvian television actresses
21st-century Peruvian women singers
21st-century Peruvian singers
Actresses from Lima
Singers from Lima
Reality television participants
Peruvian film actresses
21st-century Peruvian actresses
Peruvian people of Spanish descent
Peruvian child models